Several measures of light are commonly known as intensity:

Radiant intensity, a radiometric quantity measured in watts per steradian (W/sr)
Luminous intensity,  a photometric quantity measured in lumens per steradian (lm/sr), or candela (cd)
Irradiance, a radiometric quantity, measured in watts per square meter (W/m2)
Intensity (physics), the name for irradiance used in other branches of physics (W/m2)
Radiance, commonly called "intensity" in astronomy and astrophysics (W·sr−1·m−2)

See also
Brightness, the subjective perception elicited by the luminance of a source
Luminance, the photometric equivalent of radiance (lm·sr−1·m−2)
Photometry (optics), measurement of light, in terms of its perceived brightness to the human eye
Radiometry, measurement of light, in absolute power units 
Luminosity